Apache Brooklyn is an open-source framework for modeling, deploying and managing distributed applications defined using declarative YAML blueprints. The design is influenced by Autonomic computing and promise theory and implements the OASIS CAMP (Cloud Application Management for Platforms).

Apache Brooklyn blueprint 
Brooklyn blueprint can define application topology, application topology component and cloud or non-cloud location.

Related projects 
Cloudsoft AMP expands Apache Brooklyn and allows to write application blueprints in TOSCA (Topology and Orchestration Specification for Cloud Applications) as well as in CAMP.

References

External links 
 https://brooklyn.apache.org/learnmore/theory.html
 https://brooklyn.apache.org/learnmore/features/index.html

Configuration management
Brooklyn
Software using the Apache license
Java platform
Software distribution
2012 software